Goran Vesić (born 18 February 1969) is a Serbian politician serving as minister of construction, transport and infrastructure since 2022. A member of the Serbian Progressive Party, he has been serving as a member of the National Assembly of Serbia since 1 August 2022, while he previously served as the deputy mayor of Belgrade from 2018 to 2022.

Early life 
He finished elementary school and high school in Kraljevo. He graduated from University of Belgrade, Faculty of Law, and he was a Robert Schumann European Foundation intern in the European Parliament in 1999.

Political career 
From February to September 1997, he was a member of the Executive Board of the Assembly of the City of Belgrade, and from 1996 to 2000 he was a member of the Assembly of the City of Belgrade. From 2000 to 2003 he was a member of the National Assembly of the Republic of Serbia, from 2001 to 2002 he was the President of the Administrative Board of the National Assembly of the Republic of Serbia. He served as an advisor to the Federal Minister of the Interior of the FR Yugoslavia and Deputy Chairman of the Committee for Defense and Security of the National Assembly of the Republic of Serbia from 2001 to 2003, and as an advisor to the ministers of defense of Serbia and Montenegro from 2003 to 2004. Member of the commission for the division of military property between Serbia and Montenegro after the termination of the existence of FR Yugoslavia and the formation of the State Union of Serbia and Montenegro in the period from 2003 to 2004. He was a member of the Assembly of the city municipality of Vračar from 2004 to 2008. 

From 1994 to 1997, he was the head of the cabinet of the president of the Democratic Party (DS), Zoran Đinđić. He participated as an advisor in all election campaigns of the prime minister of Montenegro, Milo Đukanović, from 1997 to 2000, as well as in the election campaign of the former president of Republika Srpska Biljana Plavšić in 1997. After 2004, he actively participated in election campaigns in Slovenia, Montenegro, Bulgaria and North Macedonia.

In 2013 he left the Democratic Party, and joined the Serbian Progressive Party (SNS). In 2013, he became a member of the main board of the Serbian Progressive Party, and in 2016 he became a member of the presidency of the party.

From 2014 to June 2018, he was the manager of the city of Belgrade. In June 2018, by the decision of the Assembly of the City of Belgrade, he was elected deputy mayor. He was sometimes described as the de facto mayor of Belgrade. During his term, Vesić was considered one of the most unpopular politicians in Serbia. In February 2022, he was named deputy chief of the SNS election headquarters at a session of the party leadership. He was replaced by Vesna Vidović in June 2022.

Vesić appeared in the 17th position on the Serbian Progressive Party's Together We Can Do Everything electoral list in the 2022 general election. This was tantamount to election, and he was indeed elected to the National Assembly of Serbia when the list won a plurality victory with 120 out of 250 seats.

Personal life 
Vesić is an avid FK Crvena Zvezda supporter and has served on the main board of the team.

References

External links 
 Главни град мора да буде чистији - интервју („Политика”, 17. јануар 2018)
 

1969 births
Living people
Democratic Party (Serbia) politicians
Serbian Progressive Party politicians
Politicians from Kraljevo
KK Crvena Zvezda executives
University of Belgrade Faculty of Law alumni
Members of the National Assembly (Serbia)